Algarrobo is an Arabic-Spanish exonym originally meaning "the winds".

Algarrobo may refer to:

Plants
 Ceratonia siliqua, the European carob tree
 Prosopis, a genus of flowering plants in South America and elsewhere
 Samanea saman, a flowering tree called Algarrobo in Cuba
 Hymenaea, a genus of flowering plants in Colombia and the Americas

Places
 Algarrobo, Chile, a city in Chile
 Algarrobo, Magdalena, a town in Colombia
 Algarrobo, Spain, a town in Spain
 Algarrobo, Aibonito, Puerto Rico, a barrio
 Algarrobo, Guayama, Puerto Rico, a barrio
 Algarrobo, Vega Baja, Puerto Rico, a barrio
 Algarrobo, Yauco, Puerto Rico, a barrio

See also
 Los Algarrobos (disambiguation)
 Algarrobos, a barrio in the municipality of Mayagüez, Puerto Rico
 El Algarrobo, an iron mine in northern Chile